The Carthage Treasure is a Roman silver hoard, which was found in Tunis, Tunisia, at the site of the ancient city of Carthage. The treasure principally consists of silver tableware and jewellery, most of which is now held at the British Museum.

Discovery
The hoard was unearthed in the 19th century at the Hill of St Louis in Carthage, which at the time of its deposition was the largest city of Africa Proconsulare.  Most of the treasure was purchased by Sir Augustus Wollaston Franks, a senior curator at the British Museum, who bequeathed it to the museum upon his death in 1897. A small part of the treasure can be found in the Louvre, including one of the silver covered bowls.

Dating and attribution

Dating to the second half of the fourth century AD, the Carthage Treasure comprises 31 different objects, primarily luxury silver tableware and jewellery that must have belonged to a wealthy Roman family who for some reason decided to bury it for safe-keeping. This may have been because of the religious feud around 400, but it is more likely that the treasure was hidden from the Vandals. The Vandals, led by Gaiseric, invaded Africa Proconsulare from Spain in 429 and in the Battle of Carthage (439) the city became capital of the Vandal Kingdom. Inscribed in the centre of one of the dishes around the tondo is D D ICRESCONI CLARENT, which is associated with the Cresconii, a powerful Roman North African family in Carthage who are well known from deeds and records of office-holders at this time.

Description

The treasure includes a pair of flat dishes (one of which identifies the family), two bowls with chased and hammered pastoral scenes in relief around the edge, four hemispherical bowls with high tapering feet (two of which still have their covers), a shallow bowl with handle and frog engraved in the centre, twelve silver spoons, and a mixed collection of jewellery: a finger ring, a cameo, a pair of ear rings, several intaglios and two necklaces, one made of gold, the other with precious stones. The jewelled necklace consists of twelve polygonal emeralds, thirteen sapphires, matched by twenty-five pearls all joined by gold links.

The family would have owned two collections of silver: One known as argentum potorium that was the drinking set, and another for eating called the argentum escarium. Amongst this find were several silver hemispherical lidded bowls that measure 12 cm high and 12 cm in diameter. The vessels' elegant design includes a tall base that complements the knop of the bowl's lid. The bowls also incorporate subtle facets on the lids' curved surfaces. Similar bowls have been found at the Roman site of Viminacium near modern Kostolac in Serbia.

Gallery

See also

Esquiline Treasure
Mildenhall Treasure
Sevso Treasure

References

Bibliography
Kent, J. & Painter K. S. (eds), Wealth of the Roman world: AD 300–700, British Museum Publications, 1977, 9780714100616
D. Strong, Greek and Roman Silver Plate (British Museum Press, 1966)
L. Burn, The British Museum Book of Greek and Roman Art (British Museum Press, 1991)
S. Walker, Roman Art (British Museum Press, 1991)

Ancient Greek and Roman objects in the British Museum
Treasure troves of late antiquity
Silver objects
Carthage
Ancient Roman metalwork